Ganzihe railway station is a railway station on the Qinghai–Tibet Railway. It serves Ganzihe and is located 162 km from Xining railway station.

See also
List of stations on Qinghai–Tibet railway

Railway stations in Qinghai
Stations on the Qinghai–Tibet Railway